Claire Atherton is a film editor. In 2019, she received the Vision Award Ticinomoda on the occasion of the 72nd edition of the Locarno International Film Festival, becoming the first woman to receive the award.

Biography 
She was born in 1963 in San Francisco, U.S. She grew up in New-York, then in Paris. She now works and lives in France. She is the sister of Sonia Wieder-Atherton.

Attracted very young by Taoist philosophy and Chinese ideograms, she spent a few months in China in 1980, at the Institute of Foreign Language in Beijing. Then she enrolled at the National Institute for Oriental Languages and Civilizations in Paris.

Atherton had her first work experience in 1982, in Centre Audiovisuel Simone de Beauvoir in Paris where she worked as video technician. In 1984, she enrolled in the professional branch of the École Nationale Supérieure Louis-Lumière in Paris from which she graduated in 1986. She then started to work on sound and image for some of the productions of Centre Simone de Beauvoir and various other projects. From the 1990s onwards, Atherton started to mainly focus on film editing.

She met with Chantal Akerman in 1984 on the occasion of the theater adaptation of Letters Home: Correspondence 1950-1963 by Sylvia Plath which was played by Delphine Seyrig at the Petit théâtre de Paris. Seyrig asked Akerman and Atherton to film the performance

This episode marked the beginning of a 31-year collaboration between the filmmaker and the film editor, first behind the camera and then on film editing. Atherton worked with Akerman on her documentaries, fictions and installations, up until No Home Movie and NOW, an installation which was presented at the Venice Biennale in 2015.

Nowadays Atherton is in charge of the conception and spatialization of Akerman's installations, which are presented on the occasion of exhibitions in the entire world.

Atherton also works with many other filmmakers and artists. Among them are Luc Decaster, Emilio Pacull, Noëlle Pujol, Andreas Bolm, Emmanuelle Demoris, Elsa Quinette, Christine Seghezzi, Christophe Bisson, Olivier Dury and Éric Baudelaire and many others.

In 2013, the Cinémathèque de Grenoble, France, organized an event dedicated to Atherton's work as film editor. It’s the first retrospective dedicated to the body of work of an editor.

She is often invited to give master classes with young filmmakers during workshops in France and internationally. She also teaches in cinema and art schools such as La Fémis and at the HEAD School in Geneva, Switzerland.

In 2019, she received the Vision Award Ticinomoda on the occasion of the 72nd edition of the Locarno International Film Festival, becoming the first woman to receive the award which since 2013 "both highlights and pays tribute to someone whose creative work behind the scenes, as well as in their own right, has contributed to opening up new perspectives in film".

Filmography

Editing 

 1986: Letters Home by Chantal Akerman
 1986: Rue Mallet-Stevens by Chantal Akerman
 1986: Le Marteau [The Hammer] by Chantal Akerman
 1989: Marguerite Paradis by Chantal Akerman
 1992: Igor by Jean-François Gallotte
 1992: Le cinéma est mort vive le cinéma by Emilio Pacull
 1993: D'Est [From the East] by Chantal Akerman
 1993: Les Profiteroles, couples mixtes à Cuba by Emilio Pacull
 1994: Le Gamelan by Alain Jomy
 1994: Les Colonnes d'Hercule d'Emilio Pacull
 1994: Le Cinéma européen by Emilio Pacull
 1996: Un divan à New York [A couch in New York] by Chantal Akerman
 1996: Chantal Akerman par Chantal Akerman, in the collection "Cinéma de notre temps"
 1996: Les Collèges en Seine Saint-Denis by Emilio Pacull
 1997: Héros désarmés by Béatrice Kordon and Sylvie Ballyot
 1997: Le jour où… by Chantal Akerman
 1997: Ouganda, l'enfance kidnappée by Emilio Pacull
 1997: L'Épousée by Françoise Grandcolin
 1998: Emma, tribu kanak d’aujourd’hui by Emilio Pacull
 1999: Sud [South] by Chantal Akerman
 1999: Km 250 by Anne Faisandier
 2000: La Captive by Chantal Akerman
 2001: Rêve d'usine by Luc Decaster
 2001: Filles de nos mères by Séverine Mathieu
 2002: De l'autre côté [From the Other Side] by Chantal Akerman
 2002: Avec Sonia Wieder-Atherton by Chantal Akerman
 2003: Demain on déménage by Chantal Akerman
 2004: Opération Hollywood by Emilio Pacull
 2004: Autour d'hier, aujourd'hui et demain by Chantal Akerman
 2005: Là-bas by Chantal Akerman
 2005: Héros fragiles by Emilio Pacull
 2006: Portrait de Pascale, menuisière by Séverine Mathieu
 2006: Rien n’a été fait by Noëlle Pujol and Ludovic Burel
 2006: Du sucre et des fleurs dans nos moteurs by Jean-Michel Rodrigo
 2007: Entretien avec Babette Mangolte, DVD set Chantal Akerman les années 70
 2007: Entretien avec Natalia Akerman, DVD set Chantal Akerman les années 70
 2007: Entretien avec Aurore Clément, DVD set Chantal Akerman les années 70
 2007: Mafrouza « Cœur » by Emmanuelle Demoris
 2007: Mafrouza « Oh la nuit » by Emmanuelle Demoris
 2008: Mr President by Emilio Pacull
 2008: L'Écume des mères by Séverine Mathieu
 2008: Tous les enfants sauf un by Noëlle Pujol and Andreas Bolm
 2008: Fantaisie pour un château d’eau by Noëlle Pujol

 2008: Décor vidéo de Chantal Akerman pour I am a mistake de Jan Fabre
 2008: A l'Est avec Sonia Wieder-Atherton by Chantal Akerman
 2009: Tombée de nuit sur Shanghai by Chantal Akerman
 2009: Petites Histoires de mères by Séverine Mathieu
 2009: Dieu nous a pas fait naître avec des papiers by Luc Decaster
 2009: Ceux de Primo Levi by Anne Barbé
 2010: Histoire racontée par Jean Dougnac by Noëlle Pujol
 2010: Sorcières mes sœurs by Camille Ducellier
 2010: Detroit ville sauvage by Florent Tillon
 2010: On est là by Luc Decaster
 2011: La vie est ailleurs by Elsa Quinette
 2011: La Folie Almayer [Almayer's Folly] by Chantal Akerman
 2011: Les Revenants by Andreas Bolm
 2011: Avenue Rivadavia by Christine Seghezzi
 2012: Noctambules by Ilham Maad
 2012: Décor vidéo pour La Jungle des villes by Bertolt Brecht (Roger Vontobel)
 2012: Hungry Man by Philippe Martin
 2013: Au monde by Christophe Bisson
 2013: Effacée by Anna Feillou
 2013: Si j’existe je ne suis pas un autre by Marie Violaine Brincard and Olivier Dury
 2014: Qui a tué Ali Ziri ? by Luc Decaster
 2014: Histoires de la plaine by Christine Seghezzi
 2014: De la mère au désert, installation by Chantal Akerman
 2015: No Home Movie by Chantal Akerman
 2015: Aux Capucins by Anna Feillou
 2016: Jumbo Toto histoires d’un éléphant by Noëlle Pujol
 2016: Le Juge by Andreas Bolm
 2016: Silêncio by Christophe Bisson
 2016: Danse avec l’écume by Luc Decaster
 2017: Also Known As Jihadi by Éric Baudelaire 
 2018: Walked the Way Home by Éric Baudelaire
 2018: Les cavaliers fantômes by Christine Seghezzi
 2018: Altérations / Kô Murobushi by Basile Doganis
 2019: Un film dramatique by Éric Baudelaire
 2020: The Glove (short film) by Éric Baudelaire
 2020: Les lettres de Didier by Noëlle Pujol
 2020: Le chant des oubliés by Luc Decaster
 2021: When There Is No More Music to Write by Éric Baudelaire
 2021: Une Fleur à la Bouche by Éric Baudelaire
 2022: Intermède by Maria Kourkouta

Photography 

 1986: Femmes et Musique, production of Centre audiovisuel Simone de Beauvoir (first assistant camera).
 1986: Rue Mallet-Stevens by Chantal Akerman (director of photography)
 1986: Le Marteau by Chantal Akerman (director of photography)
 1988: Histoires d’Amérique by Chantal Akerman (first assistant camera)
 1988: L’institut du monde Arabe (first assistant camera)
 1988: Marguerite Paradis by Chantal Akerman (director of photography)
 1988: Notes pour Debussy by Jean-Patrick Lebel (first assistant camera)
 1990: Igor by Jean-François Gallotte (director of photography)

Installations 

 1995: Le 25e écran, an installation by Chantal Akerman
 1998: Autobiography, selfportrait in progress, an installation by Chantal Akerman
 2001: Woman Sitting After Killing, an installation by Chantal Akerman
 2002: From the Other Side, an installation by Chantal Akerman
 2002: A voice in the Desert, an installation by Chantal Akerman
 2004: Marcher à côté de ses lacets dans un frigidaire vide, an installation by Chantal Akerman
 2007: La Chambre, an installation by Chantal Akerman
 2007: Je tu il elle, an installation by Chantal Akerman
 2007: In the Mirror, an installation by Chantal Akerman
 2008: Femmes d’Anvers en Novembre, an installation by Chantal Akerman
 2009: Maniac Summer, an installation by Chantal Akerman
 2015: NOW, an installation by Chantal Akerman
 2019: Tu peux prendre ton temps, an installation by Éric Baudelaire
 2020: Death Passed My Way and Stuck This Flower in My Mouth, installation d'Éric Baudelaire

Exhibitions 

 2015: Chantal Akerman: NOW, Ambika P3, Londres, Oct. 30 - Nov. 6, 2015.
 2016: Group show ‘Imagine Europe: In search of New Narratives’, BOZAR, Brussels, April 13 - May 29, 2016 (Chantal Akerman: D'Est).
 2016: Chantal Akerman: Maniac Shadows, la Ferme du Buisson, Noisiel, Nov. 19, 2016 - Feb.19, 2017.
 2017: Chantal Akerman: NOW et In The Mirror, Marian Goodman Gallery, Paris, Sept. 14 - Nov. 21, 2017.
 2018: Group show ‘Scenes from the Collection, Constellations’, Jewish Museum, New York, 21 janvier - 31 juillet 2018 (Chantal Akerman: NOW, 2015).
 2018: Group show ‘Pedro Costa: Company’, Contemporary art museum of Serralves, Porto, Oct. 19, 2018 - Jan. 29, 2019 (Chantal Akerman: Femmes d’Anvers en Novembre, 2008).
 2018: Chantal Akerman: ‘Tempo Expandido / Expanded Time’, Oi Futuro, Rio,Nov. 26, 2018 - Jan. 27, 2019.
 2018: Solo show of Chantal Akerman, MOCA, Toronto, Feb. 14 - May 12, 2019.
 2019: Group show ‘Defiant Muses: Delphine Seyrig and the Feminist Video Collectives in France (1970s-1980s)’, Museo Reina Sofía, Madrid, Sept. 25 - March 23, 2019 (Chantal Akerman: Woman Sitting After Killing, 2001).
2020 : 'From the Other Side, Fragment', MUAC, Mexico, March 7 - April 19, 2020. Exhibition curated by Claire Atherton.
2020 : 'Chantal Akerman: Passages', Eye Museum, Amsterdam, June 1 - August 30, 2020.
2021: 'Chantal Akerman : From The Other Side', Galerie Marian Goodman Paris, December 7th, 2021 - February 5th, 2022. Artistic direction : Claire Atherton
2022: 'Chantal Akerman : STANZE Sul custodire il perdere', Casa Masaccio, February 26 - May 8, 2022. Artistic direction : Claire Atherton

See also

Articles and Publications 

  2015: Tribute to Chantal Akerman: translation by Felicity Caplin of the text  written and read by Claire Atherton at the Cinémathèque Française in Paris, on Novembre 16, 2015, on the occasion of the screening of No Home Movie : 'Chantal Akerman: La Passion de L’Intime / An Intimate Passion', Senses of Cinema n° 77, Dec. 2015, also published in Camera Obscrura: Feminism, Culture and Media Studies, Duke University Press, 2019.
2016: Interview with Tina Poglajen, Film Comment.
 2017: ‘Our Way of Working: A Conversation with Claire Atherton about Chantal Akerman’, interview with Ivone Margulies, Camera Obscura n°100, pp 13–28.
 2018: 'Pouvons-nous être en relation avec ce qui est  ? / Can we be in touch with what is?', Qu'est-ce que le réel ? Des cinéastes prennent position/What is Real? Filmmakers weigh in, dir. Andréa Picard, Post-édition / Cinéma du Réel, 2018, pp. 13–16.
 2018: ‘A conversation with Claire Atherton’, by Roger Crittenden, Fine Cuts: Interview on the Practice of European Film Editing, New-York: Routledge, 2018.
 2019: 'Living Matter’, Bomb n°148.
 2019: ‘On Chantal Akerman’, News From Home: The Films of Chantal Akerman (catalogue published on the occasion of Akeman's retrospective organized as part of the Toronto International Film Festival).
 2019: ‘About D'Est. Editing Chantal Akerman’s Film’, Versopolis, nov. 4, 2019.
 2019: ‘The Art of Living’, interview with Yaniya Lee, canadianart, 1er mars 2019 (web).

Talks and Masterclasses 

 2016: "Editing, A Composition", Jihlava International Film Festival,.
 2016: "The Art of Editing": Tel Aviv International Student Films Festival.
 2018: Frankfurt University, Masterclass and presentation of D’est by Chantal Akerman.
 2019: A conversation with Claire Atherton moderated by Antoine Thirion and Nicholas Elliott during the 72nd edition of the International Film Festival of Locarno.
2020:  "The Mechanism of the Organic ", masterclass of Claire Atherton moderated by Antoine Thirion, during the 10th edition of FICUNAM, Mexico. 
2020: "Spatializing cinema : a conversation between Claire Atherton and Dana Linssen", Eye Museum, Amsterdam. 
2020 : 'Pensadores Contemporáneos en Síntesis', filmed interview with Bani Khoshnoudi for TV UNAM, March 2020.

Bibliography 

 2019: Laura Davis, "Un film dramatique", Filmexplorer (web).
 2019: Laura Davis, "Listening to Images: A conversation with Editor Claire Atherton", Mubi notebook (web).
 2019: Justine Smith, ‘ “Not Knowing Where You’re Going”: How Claire Atherton Edits Movies’, Hypperallergic (web).
 2019: Lorenzo Buccella, "Life needs editing", News from the Locarno Festival (web).

References 

1963 births
Living people
American film editors
French film editors
People from San Francisco
American women film editors
French women film editors
21st-century American women